, also commonly known as Litchi Hikari Club, is a Japanese horror manga series written and illustrated by Usamaru Furuya and based on a play with the same name. It was serialized in Ohta Publishing's Manga Erotics F magazine between May 2005 and May 2006. A prequel to the original story, Our Light Club, was serialized in Ohta Publishing's online pocopoco magazine between April 2011 and March 2012.

A comedic anime adaptation aired between October and November 2012 on Tokyo MX. The series' visual and style also inspired the formation of a rock band in 2011. Three stage plays have also been performed in 2012, 2013 and 2015 and a live-action film was released in 2016.

Plot
The story centers around a nine-member club of middle school boys called the Light Club, in their endeavor to create an AI in order to abduct beautiful girls. As the club uses increasingly depraved methods to reach their goal, the original leader, Tamiya, tries to reclaim his position after he becomes unhappy with the way the new leader, Zera, runs the club.

Publication
Written and illustrated by Usamaru Furuya, Lychee Light Club is loosely based upon a 1985 play of the same name directed by Norimizu Ameya for the theatrical group Tokyo Grand Guignol. It premiered in Ohta Publishing's Manga Erotics F magazine on May 7, 2005 and finished serialization on May 3, 2006. A single tankōbon volume was published by Ohta on June 21, 2006 and later digitally released on November 6, 2008. At the 2010 Comic-Con, Vertical announced that it had licensed it for an English-language translation in North America. Vertical published its paperback edition on April 26, 2011.

A prequel to the original story that unveils the past of the club members was announced in January 2011. Called , it was serialized in Ohta Publishing's online pocopoco magazine between April 15, 2011 and March 15, 2012.

Anime adaptation
In August 2012, the franchise official site announced an anime adaptation titled  to premiere in October. Consisting of eight comedy shorts, it was broadcast on Tokyo MX from October 2 to November 20, 2012. It was directed by Masahiro Takata, screenplayed by Motoichi Adachi, and produced by Chihiro Nagai under Kachidoki Studio. A DVD compilation was released by Cammot on December 26, 2012. The series was made available online by Crunchyroll in the English-speaking regions of North America, the United Kingdom, Ireland, South Africa, Australia and New Zealand.

Episode list

Reception
Debora Aoki of About.com elected it the sixth most anticipated graphic novel to be published in 2011, writing it is a "compelling story like no other". During a 2011 panel at Comic-Con, Carlo Santos of Anime News Network elected it one of the best manga of the year, calling it "foul, disgusting, and wonderful".

Legacy

Stage plays
In January 2011, a stage adaptation was announced, although the cast was only announced in August 2012. Directed and written by Junko Emoto, the play ran from December 14 to 25, 2012 at Kinokuniya Hall in Tokyo. A second adaptation was announced in September 2013 and kept the most of te cast, except for Rin Honoka who was replaced by Aimi Satsukawa as Kanon. It was also directed and written by Emoto and ran at AiiA Theater Tokyo from December 16 to 24, 2013. Another play, this time directed by Masahiko Kawahara and written by Maruichirō Maruo, ran at 2.5 AiiA Theater Tokyo between December 18 and 27, 2015. The 2012–2013 run had Ryo Kimura as its protagonist, Zera, and Tomoya Nakamura took the role for the 2015 version. TC Entertainment released the first play in DVD format on April 26, 2013, while the 2015 play's DVD is set to be released on April 27, 2016.

Band
Rock band Penicillin's vocalist Hakuei, who composed the music for the anime, created a musical act after the manga to express Lychee Light Clubs world through music.  was the first song released by the group as both a standard ringtone and a full-length ringtone as a standard ringtone and full-length ringtone on January 1, 2011. This and five more songs were released in the mini album titled  on December 21, 2011.

A split album containing six tracks performed along with the band Machine, Rendez-vous, was released on July 25, 2012. On December 12, 2012, they released their first full album, the eleven-track  and the compilation album . They performed again at Tokyo Kinema Club, this time along with Machine, on December 30, 2012 and its DVD, was released on March 21, 2013.

A mini album, was released on December 11, 2013, and was followed by a tour from December 25, 2013 to January 26, 2014. The first performance of this tour, at AiiA Theater Tokyo, was released into a live DVD on March 27, 2014. The release of the mini album titled  on August 13, 2014 led them to have a tour from August 24 to 30. On July 26, 2015, the band started a tour to promote the album Jesus Christ Hyperstar—released on July 29—that lasted until August 8.

Film adaptation
In April 2013, Ohta Publishing announced a live-action version of the manga had been green-lit. Only in July 2015, though, the main cast and staff, a trailer and a release date—Japan's winter—were revealed. It was directed by Eisuke Naitō, co-written by Naitō and Keisuke Tominaga and starred Shūhei Nomura as Tamiya and Yuki Furukawa as Zera. Produced by Marble Film and distributed by Nikkatsu, it premiered worldwide at the 20th Busan International Film Festival on October 2, 2015. Although its nationwide release was initially scheduled to be in January 2016, in November 2015 it was postponed to February 13, 2016, when the film was ultimately released.

Elizabeth Kerr of The Hollywood Reporter considered it to be "familiar territory of out-of-control, angry teens". If most performances "are there in service of the spectacular splatter", "capping to off" is Lychee, "its heart". What can be highlighted, in her opinion, is the art direction and production design; the film setting has cityscapes "that Philip K. Dick would be proud of". The music was compared to Tetsuo: The Iron Man and was said to be "a sometimes discordant soundtrack that adds to the overall atmosphere". The Japan Times critic Mark Schilling described it "as if the Marquis de Sade had penned Peter Pan" because of is horror elements. Indeed, "just when the film is becoming a mash-up of Beauty and the Beast and Pinocchio, with [Lychee] fulfilling his dream of love and manhood, twists multiply and the pace quickens. And we are abruptly reminded why the film's 'horror' label still applies." Schilling criticized the characters portrayal that seemed "more like manga archetypes than flesh-and-blood boys" and its good versus evil dichotomy calling it "as black-and-white as a folktale's (or a commercial manga's), making its surprises less than surprising — save perhaps for the last."

References

External links
Bokurano Hikari Club on pocopoco's website 

2005 manga
2011 manga
2012 anime television series debuts
Anime series based on manga
Comedy anime and manga
Dark fantasy anime and manga
Manga adapted into films
Ohta Publishing manga
Tokyo MX original programming
Vertical (publisher) titles